Who Cares or Who Cares? may refer to:
 "Who Cares?" (George and Ira Gershwin song) (1931)
 "Who Cares?" (Gnarls Barkley song) (2006)
 "Who Cares" (Paul McCartney song) (2018)
 Who Cares? (ballet), a 1970 ballet by George Balanchine made to songs by George Gershwin
 Who Cares? (1919 film), a silent comedy film starring Constance Talmadge
 Who Cares (1925 film), a silent film starring Dorothy Devore
 Who Cares? (band), the ensemble responsible for performing 1985 charity single "Doctor in Distress"
 Who Cares? (album), a 2022 album by Rex Orange County
 WhoCares, a musical charity project by Ian Gillan, Tony Iommi & Friends
 Ian Gillan & Tony Iommi: WhoCares, an album by WhoCares
 Who Cares, the debut album of Australian rock band the Poor
 "Who Cares", a Don Gibson song (1959)
 "Who Cares?", a song by Huey Lewis and the News from the album, Huey Lewis and the News (1980)

See also
Who Cares a Lot?, an album by Faith No More
Who Cares a Lot?: The Greatest Videos, a video album by Faith No More